The 2006 Division 1 season was the 41st of the competition of the first-tier football in Senegal.  The tournament was organized by the Senegalese Football Federation.  The season began on 5 January and finished on 15 July.  AS Douanes won their third title.  AS Douanes along with Port Autonome would compete in the 2007 CAF Champions League the following season.  US Ouakam who won the 2006 Senegalese Cup participated in the 2007 CAF Confederation Cup, along with US Gorée.  Compagnie sucrière sénégalaise, last place of Group A relegated to the second division with 14 points as they had a penalty that cost them three points by an undetermined reason, US Rail, last place of Group B was relegated with only 9 points.

The season would feature 18 clubs. 156 matches (144 in the first phase and 12 in the second phase) were played and 244 goals were scored.  Yet again since the 1990s, the season would feature the first and second phases, the first phase featured the group system with a total of 72 matches for each group, the second or final phase would consist of four clubs (instead of a playoff as did in the 1990s) with a total of 12 matches, each club played a total of six matches and the highest number of points would decide the season's champion.

ASC Port Autonome was the defending team of the title.

Participating clubs

 Compagnie sucrière sénégalaise (Senegalese Sugar Company)
 ASC Port Autonome
 AS Douanes
 ASC Jeanne d'Arc
 ASC Saloum
 US Gorée
 Casa Sport
 ASC Yakaar
 ASC Xam Xam

 ASC HLM
 ASC Diaraf
 US Rail
 Dakar Université Club
 SONACOS
 ASEC Ndiambour
 Stade de Mbour
 US Ouakam
 Guédiawaye FC

Overview
The league was contested by 18 teams and two groups, the first phase consisted of 9 clubs in each of the two groups and the second and final phase consisted of only four clubs.

League standings

Group A

Group B

Second and final phase

References

Football in Senegal
Senegal Premier League seasons
2005–06 in African association football leagues